Dark Swan is a novel sequence by Richelle Mead. The novels center on Eugenie Markham, a shaman; the shapeshifting Kiyo, her boyfriend; and Dorian, the king of the fairies.

Publication history 
There are four books in the series, with another possibly in the far-off future
 Storm Born (August 5, 2008): Nominee - 2008 Reviewers' Choice Awards - Best Urban Fantasy Novel 
 Thorn Queen (July 28, 2009)
 Iron Crowned (February 22, 2011)
 Shadow Heir (December 27, 2011)

References

American novel series
American fantasy novel series
Novels by Richelle Mead